Anding District is a rural district of about 29,914 residents in Tainan, Taiwan, with a area of 31.27 square kilometers, or 12.0734 square miles. It is the 17th most populous district in Tainan, with a population density of 959 people per square kilometer, or 2,483 people per square mile.

History 
During the Dutch colonial era the area was known as Bakloan or Baccloan, with a rarer spelling of Baccaluang. The village was one of four main aboriginal villages near the Dutch base of Tayouan, with around 1,500 inhabitants.

Republic of China
After the handover of Taiwan from Japan to the Republic of China in 1945, Anding was organized as a rural township of Tainan County. On 25 December 2010, Tainan County was merged with Tainan City and Anding was upgraded to a district of the city.

Administrative divisions 
Anding district consists of Sulin, Sucuo, Anding, Baoxi, Anjia, Gangwei, Nanan, Guanliao, Zhongrong, Gangkou, Hailiao, Datong, Liujia, Gangnan, Zhongsa and Xinji Borough.

Tourist attractions 
 Changsing Temple
 Little Confucius Temple

References

Cited works

External links 

 

Districts of Tainan